Indian National Basketball Championship for Women is a professional basketball tournament in India for women. This tournament is held by the Basketball Federation of India. The 61st Championship was held in New Delhi in 2011. 23 states teams participated in this tournament.

History
At the 2019 event, Indian Railways team staved off Kerala 68-55. 
Led by the new national team player Shireen Limaye, Railways won their third straight title. Madhya Pradesh also secured a rare podium finish by beating Punjab in the bronze medal game.

In the semifinals, Kerala ousted Punjab 73-62 while Railways absolutely decimated Madhya Pradesh 106-37 to reach the finals.

Teams
The participating teams are:

Upper Pool
 Andhra Pradesh
 Chhattisgarh
 Delhi
 Railways
 Karnataka
 Kerala
 Maharashtra
 Punjab
 Tamil Nadu
 Uttar Pradesh

Lower Pool
 Bihar
 Chandigarh
 Gujarat
 Haryana
 Himachal Pradesh
 Jammu and Kashmir
 Jharkhand
 Madhya Pradesh
 Odisha
 Puducherry
 Rajasthan
 Uttarakhand
 West Bengal

See also
National Basketball Championship (men)

References

External links
Events and Recruitment (Basketball federation of India site)

Basketball competitions in India
Women's basketball leagues in Asia
Women's basketball in India